Sant'Agostino is a Romanesque-style Roman Catholic church in central Fossombrone, region of Marche, Italy. The church was erected in the 14th century, and the facade still has the elements of late Romanesque architecture. The church was however refurbished in neoclassical style by Camillo Morigia in the early 1800s. The facade has the coat of arms of the Malatesta and a mortar and pestle insignia of a guild. The interior has a main altarpiece of a Nativity by Federico Zuccari. In addition, there is a Madonna and child with Saints by Giovanni Francesco Guerrieri in the second altar on the left. The church also has wooden icons of St Augustine and Santa Monica from the 17th century.

References

Churches in the Province of Pesaro and Urbino
Roman Catholic churches in the Marche
Romanesque architecture in le Marche
Neoclassical architecture in le Marche
14th-century Roman Catholic church buildings in Italy
Neoclassical church buildings in Italy